City News might refer to one of the following:

City News (film), 1984
City News Los Angeles, an LGBT newspaper
CityNews, news and current affairs programming on the Citytv network in Canada
CityNews Channel, defunct news channel
City News Bureau of Chicago, a former news bureau
City News Service, a regional news service covering Southern California

See also

 City Paper (disambiguation)
 Business news
 City Journal
 City Newspaper